Lawrence Damon Funderburke (born December 15, 1970) is an American former professional basketball player.

Basketball career
Funderburke was born and raised in Columbus, Ohio, where he played high school basketball at Wehrle High School, leading them to a state championship in his junior season (1988).

Collegiate career
Funderburke played his freshman year of college basketball at Indiana University, where he is known for tangling with Bobby Knight. He transferred after that season to Ohio State University, where he played his three remaining years of eligibility. There, he teamed with fellow future NBA player Jimmy Jackson to lead Ohio State to the Big Ten Championship in 1992.

NBA career
Funderburke was drafted by the Sacramento Kings in the 2nd round (51st overall) of the 1994 NBA Draft, honing his game in Europe (with Greece's Ampelokipoi and PAOK and French outfit Pau-Orthez) for three years before joining the Kings in 1997.

Funderburke averaged 9.5 points and 4.5 rebounds as a rookie and played a role for the Kings during their successful seasons spanning from 1999–2003 as a backup to Chris Webber. After serving mainly as a reliable backup for Webber for six seasons, Funderburke missed the entire 2003–04 season, ultimately being waived in March 2004.

After appearing in two games for the Chicago Bulls, Funderburke retired in June 2005, holding NBA career averages of 6.4 points, 3.6 rebounds and 0.6 assists per game.

Other activities
Funderburke graduated with a degree in business finance from Ohio State. While an active player in 2000, Funderburke and his wife founded the Lawrence Funderburke Youth Organization, a non-profit organization dedicated to help at-risk children through a variety of services. Hook Me Up, Playa! is a book by Funderburke that warns both professional and aspiring athletes of the dark side of the limelight through interviews with close friends who are (or were) professional athletes.

Personal life
Funderburke's daughter, Nyah, is currently a student-athlete competing for the Ohio State swim team. She qualified for the 2022 NCAA Division I Swimming Championships and was named a CSCAA first-team All-American for her contributions on Ohio State's 400-yard medley relay that finished eighth overall.

References

External links
 NBA.com profile
 nba.com historical playerfile
 Hoopshype.com career and profile
 Stats at BasketballReference
 at makthes
 Lawrence Funderburke Youth Organization
 Basketpedya.com Profile

1970 births
Living people
African-American basketball players
American expatriate basketball people in France
American expatriate basketball people in Greece
American men's basketball players
Ampelokipoi B.C. players
Basketball players from Columbus, Ohio
Chicago Bulls players
Élan Béarnais players
Greek Basket League players
Indiana Hoosiers men's basketball players
Ohio State Buckeyes men's basketball players
P.A.O.K. BC players
Power forwards (basketball)
Sacramento Kings draft picks
Sacramento Kings players
21st-century African-American sportspeople
20th-century African-American sportspeople